The Manteca Bulletin is the newspaper of record and daily newspaper for Manteca, California, United States. The Bulletin has been published since 1908. It is currently owned by the locally-owned 209 Multimedia. The editor is Dennis Wyatt.

Community newspaper 
The Bulletin is a community newspaper and places a heavy emphasis on local news. Like many community newspapers, the Bulletin does not report national or wire service news on its front page. However, the Bulletin will often localize national news if the story has a local impact, or to get local perspective. Non-local news is typically relegated to the inside pages and is often limited in scope.

Early history 
To promote a large-scale water project that was the forerunner to today’s South San Joaquin Irrigation District, two men - F.L. Wurster and A.L. Cowell - joined forces to print the Irrigation Bulletin in November 1908.

With the help of the South San Joaquin Chamber of Commerce, the Bulletin expanded into a standard-size weekly newspaper on June 3, 1910, when it was moved from Stockton to Ripon. The paper continued to promote the South San Joaquin Irrigation District, which was founded in 1909, and carried news of the district's bond sales to investors throughout California.

Water began flowing in 1915 and the South County's population boomed. Several newspapers arose to serve this community, among them the Escalon Times, Lathrop Sun and Ripon Record. The Bulletin changed its name to the Manteca Bulletin on November 6, 1914, and merged on March 22, 1918, with the Manteca Enterprise, which had been founded November 1, 1911.

In 1923, George Murphy Sr. partnered with Louis Meyer to purchase the Manteca Bulletin. This began 50 years of ownership by the Murphy family; on April 1, 1972, when George Murphy Jr. sold the Bulletin to Charles Morris and his family-owned Morris Multimedia. Morris sold its California division to 209 Multimedia in 2020.

Opinions and plagiarism 
In response to an outcry over plagiarism in the newspaper's opinion pages, the Bulletin published an editorial acknowledging the problem in 2009.

The newspaper's editorials are characterized by a conservative stance on immigration and social issues. For example, Managing Editor Dennis Wyatt wrote that if immigrants "preferred their lives in whatever country they heralded where they weren’t required to speak English to communicate in a business, in school, on a job or with the government then perhaps they should have thought twice about coming to the United States."

Competition 
The paper competes locally with the Modesto Bee, The Record, and the San Joaquin Herald, as well as the weekly Ripon Record.

Other newspapers 
2019 Multimedia also publishes 209 Magazine, a regional magazine, the semiweekly Turlock Journal, and the weeklies the Ceres Courier, the Escalon Times, the Gustine Press Standard, the Oakdale Leader, the Riverbank News, and the West Side Index of Newman.

References

External links
Manteca Bulletin Online

Morris Multimedia
Daily newspapers published in California
Publications established in 1908
1908 establishments in California